Watson's Ferry was a former settlement, river ferry and steamboat landing on Fresno Slough near its confluence with the San Joaquin River nearby to the northeast of modern Mendota in what is now   Fresno County, California.  Watson's Ferry was located 8 miles southeast of Firebaugh.

History
Watson's Ferry was the head of steamboat navigation on Fresno Slough, 248 miles up the San Joaquin River from Stockton, California from the late 1860s to the early 1900s, when irrigation deprived Fresno Slough and the San Joaquin River of water to the point it closed the upper river to navigation.  It was an important crossing, connecting the west side of Fresno County to the county seat to the east.  It became a center for sheep shearing, handling up to 200,000 sheep a year.  Wool from this operation was shipped by steamer to San Francisco.   After the construction of Whites Bridge two miles up the Fresno Slough, Whites Bridge became the new head of navigation.

References

Former settlements in Fresno County, California
Former populated places in California